DeWitt Township may refer to the following places in the United States:

 DeWitt Township, DeWitt County, Illinois
 De Witt Township, Clinton County, Iowa
 DeWitt Charter Township, Michigan
 De Witt Township, Carroll County, Missouri
 De Witt Township, Perkins County, South Dakota

See also 
 DeWitt (disambiguation) 

Township name disambiguation pages